Reshetovsky is a rural locality (a khutor) in Sharashenskoye Rural Settlement, Alexeyevsky District, Volgograd Oblast, Russia. The population was 41 as of 2010.

Geography 
Reshetovsky is located 37 km southeast from Alexeyevskaya (the district's administrative centre) by road. Zakharovsky is the nearest rural locality.

References 

Rural localities in Alexeyevsky District, Volgograd Oblast